Dagou Willie Anderson Britto (born 1 June 1996), known as Willie Britto, is an Ivorian professional footballer who plays as a right back.

Professional career
On 4 July 2019, Britto signed with FC Zürich on a 4 year contract. Britto made his debut with Zürich in a 4-0 Swiss Super League loss to FC Lugano on 21 July 2019. On 18. August 2021 the contract with Zürich was terminated by mutual agreement.

FK Pohronie
Britto signed with Fortuna Liga club FK Pohronie on a half-year loan. Britto made his Fortuna Liga debut for Pohronie on 6 February 2021, in a fixture played at neutral ground at Štadión pod Dubňom, against Nitra. He was featured in the starting line-up but was taken off the pitch and replaced by Alieu Fadera, with the score at 1:1, due to an injury. Pohronie won the fixture 3:1, following two strikes by Adler Da Silva and one by Andrej Štrba. Nitra connected by Kilian Pagliuca. This constituted Pohronie's mere second victory in the season. Due to the injury, Britto did not appear in any further matches for Pohronie.

International career
Britto debuted for the Ivory Coast football team in a 1-1 friendly tie with Zambia on 25 October 2014. He represented the Ivory Coast U23s at the 2015 Toulon Tournament.

References

External links
 Soccerway Profile
 FCZ Profile
 SFL Profile
 SAPO Profile

1996 births
Living people
People from Bas-Sassandra District
Ivorian footballers
Ivorian expatriate footballers
Ivory Coast international footballers
Ivory Coast under-20 international footballers
Association football fullbacks
AS Indenié Abengourou players
AS Tanda players
FC Zürich players
FK Pohronie players
Ligue 1 (Ivory Coast) players
Swiss Super League players
Slovak Super Liga players
Expatriate footballers in Switzerland
Ivorian expatriate sportspeople in Switzerland
Expatriate footballers in Slovakia
Ivorian expatriate sportspeople in Slovakia
Ivory Coast A' international footballers
2016 African Nations Championship players
2018 African Nations Championship players